Petalosarsia is a crustacean genus in the family Pseudocumatidae, comprising three species:
Petalosarsia brevirostris (Gamo, 1986)
Petalosarsia declivis (Sars, 1865)
Petalosarsia longirostris (Jones, 1973)

References

External links

Cumacea
Taxa named by Thomas Roscoe Rede Stebbing